The Statute of Sewers (23 Hen 8 c. 5) was a 1531 law enacted by the English Reformation Parliament of King Henry VIII. It sought to make the powers of various commissions of sewers permanent, whereas previously, each parliament had to renew their powers. It is noted as one of the earliest occurrences in English legal history of a Henry VIII power. The statute gave the commissions of sewers legislative powers, the power to impose taxation upon landowners, and the power to impose penalties for the non-payment of those taxes.

References 

Acts of the Parliament of England (1485–1603)
1531 in law
1531 in England